Società Sportiva Lazio (Lazio Sport Club), commonly referred to as Lazio, is an Italian professional sports club based in Rome, most known for its football activity. The society, founded in 1900, plays in the Serie A and have spent most of their history in the top tier of Italian football. Lazio have been Italian champions twice (1974, 2000), and have won the Coppa Italia seven times, the Supercoppa Italiana three times, and both the UEFA Cup Winners' Cup and UEFA Super Cup on one occasion.

The club had their first major success in 1958, winning the domestic cup. In 1974, they won their first Serie A title. The 1990s were the most successful period in Lazio's history, with the team reaching the UEFA Cup final in 1998, winning the UEFA Cup Winners' Cup and UEFA Super Cup in 1999, and clinching the Serie A title in 2000. Due to a severe economic crisis in 2002 that forced president Sergio Cragnotti out of the club along with several star players being sold, Lazio's success in the league declined. In spite of the lower funds, the club has won four Coppa Italia titles since then; in 2004, 2009, 2013 and 2019. Current president Claudio Lotito took charge of the club in 2004, filling the vacuum that had existed following Cragnotti's departure.

Lazio's traditional kit colours are sky blue shirts and white shorts with white socks; the colours are reminiscent of Rome's ancient Hellenic legacy. Sky blue socks have also been interchangeably used as home colours. Their home is the 70,634 capacity Stadio Olimpico in Rome, which they share with A.S. Roma. Lazio have a long-standing rivalry with Roma, with whom they have contested the Derby della Capitale (in English "Derby of the capital city" or Rome derby) since 1929.

Despite initially not having any parent–subsidiary relation with the male and female professional team (that was incorporated as S.S. Lazio S.p.A.), the founding of Società Sportiva Lazio allowed for the club that participates in over 40 sports disciplines in total, more than any other sports association in the world.

History

Società Podistica Lazio was founded on 9 January 1900 in the Prati district of Rome. Until 1910, the club played at an amateur level until it officially joined the league competition in 1912 as soon as the Italian Football Federation began organising championships in the center and south of Italy, and reached the final of the national championship playoff three times, but never won, losing in 1913 to Pro Vercelli, in 1914 to Casale and in 1923 to Genoa 1893. In 1927, Lazio was the only major Roman club which resisted the Fascist regime's attempts to merge all the city's teams into what would become A.S. Roma the same year. The club played in the first organised Serie A in 1929 and, led by legendary Italian striker Silvio Piola, achieved a second-place finish in 1937 – its highest pre-war result.

The 1950s produced a mix of mid and upper table results with a Coppa Italia win in 1958. Lazio was relegated for the first time in 1961 to the Serie B, but returned in the top flight two years later. After a number of mid-table placements, another relegation followed in 1970–71. Back to Serie A in 1972–73, Lazio immediately emerged as surprise challengers for the Scudetto to Milan and Juventus in 1972–73, only losing out on the final day of the season, with a team comprising captain Giuseppe Wilson, as well as midfielders Luciano Re Cecconi and Mario Frustalupi, striker Giorgio Chinaglia, and head coach Tommaso Maestrelli. Lazio improved such successes the following season, ensuring its first title in 1973–74. However, tragic deaths of Re Cecconi and Scudetto trainer Maestrelli, as well as the departure of Chinaglia, would be a triple blow for Lazio. The emergence of Bruno Giordano during this period provided some relief as he finished League top scorer in 1979, when Lazio finished eighth.

Lazio were forcibly relegated to Serie B in 1980 due to a remarkable scandal concerning illegal bets on their own matches, along with Milan. They remained in Italy's second division for three seasons in what would mark the darkest period in Lazio's history. They would return in 1983 and manage a last-day escape from relegation the following season. The 1984–85 season would prove harrowing, with a pitiful 15 points and bottom place finish.

In 1986, Lazio was hit with a nine-point deduction (a true deathblow back in the day of the two-point win) for a betting scandal involving player Claudio Vinazzani. An epic struggle against relegation followed the same season in Serie B, with the club led by trainer Eugenio Fascetti only avoiding relegation to the Serie C after play-off wins over Taranto and Campobasso. This would prove a turning point in the club's history, with Lazio returning to Serie A in 1988 and, under the careful financial management of Gianmarco Calleri, the consolidation of the club's position as a solid top-flight club.

The arrival of Sergio Cragnotti in 1992 changed the club's history due to his long-term investments in new players to make the team a Scudetto competitor. A notable early transfer during his tenure was the capture of English midfielder Paul Gascoigne from Tottenham Hotspur for £5.5 million. Gascoigne's transfer to Lazio is credited with the increase of interest in Serie A in the United Kingdom during the 1990s. Cragnotti repeatedly broke transfer records in pursuit of players who were considered major stars – Juan Sebastián Verón for £18 million, Christian Vieri for £19 million and breaking the world transfer record, albeit only for a matter of weeks, to sign Hernán Crespo from Parma for £35 million.

Lazio were Serie A runners-up in 1995, third in 1996 and fourth in 1997, then losing the championship just by one point to Milan on the last championship's match in 1999 before, with the likes of Siniša Mihajlović, Alessandro Nesta, Marcelo Salas and Pavel Nedvěd in the side, winning its second Scudetto in 2000, as well as the Coppa Italia double with Sven-Göran Eriksson (1997–2001) as manager.

Lazio had two more Coppa Italia triumphs in 1998 and 2004, as well as the last UEFA Cup Winners' Cup in 1999. They also reached the UEFA Cup, but lost 0–3 against Internazionale. In addition, Lazio won the Supercoppa Italiana twice and defeated Manchester United in 1999 to win the UEFA Super Cup. In 2000, Lazio became also the first Italian football club to be quoted on the Italian Piazza Affari stock market.

With money running out, Lazio's results slowly worsened in the years. In 2002, a financial scandal involving Cragnotti and his food products multinational Cirio forced him to leave the club, and Lazio was controlled until 2004 by caretaker financial managers and a bank pool. This forced the club to sell their star players and even fan favourite captain Alessandro Nesta. In 2004, entrepreneur Claudio Lotito acquired the majority of the club. In 2006, the club qualified to the 2006–07 UEFA Cup under coach Delio Rossi. The club, however, was excluded from European competitions due to their involvement in the 2006 Italian football scandal.

In the 2006–07 season, despite a later-reduced points deduction, Lazio achieved a third-place finish, thus gaining qualification to the UEFA Champions League third qualifying round, where they defeated Dinamo București to reach the group phase, and ended fourth place in the group composed of Real Madrid, Werder Bremen and Olympiacos. Things in the league did not go much better, with the team spending most of the season in the bottom half of the table, sparking the protests of the fans, and eventually ending the Serie A season in 12th place. In the 2008–09 season, Lazio won their fifth Coppa Italia, beating Sampdoria in the final.

Lazio started the 2009–10 season playing the Supercoppa Italiana against Inter in Beijing and winning the match 2–1, with goals from Matuzalém and Tommaso Rocchi. Lazio won the 2012–13 Coppa Italia 1–0 over rivals Roma with the lone goal coming from Senad Lulić. Lazio won the 2018–19 Coppa Italia 2–0 over Atalanta, winning their seventh title overall.

On 22 December 2019, Lazio won their fifth Supercoppa Italiana title, following a 3–1 victory over Juventus. Lazio mounted an unexpected title challenge during the 2019–20 Serie A season. A poor run of form following the restart of the Serie A campaign after the COVID-19 suspension saw Lazio fall out of the title race. On 24 July 2020, Lazio qualified for the Champions League for the first time in 12 years after securing a top 4 finish.

Colours, badge and nicknames

Lazio's colours of white and sky blue were inspired by the national emblem of Greece, due to the fact that Lazio is a mixed sports club this was chosen in recognition of the fact that the Ancient Olympic Games and along with it the sporting tradition in Europe is linked to Greece.

Originally, Lazio wore a shirt which was divided into white and sky blue quarters, with black shorts and socks. After a while of wearing a plain white shirt very early on, Lazio reverted to the colours which they wear today. Some seasons Lazio have used a sky blue and white shirt with stripes, but usually it is sky blue with a white trim, with the white shorts and socks. The club's colours have led to their Italian nickname of Biancocelesti.

Lazio's traditional club badge and symbol is the eagle, which was chosen by founding member Luigi Bigiarelli. It is an acknowledgment to the emblem of Zeus (the god of sky and thunder in Greek mythology) commonly referred to as Aquila; Lazio's use of the symbol has led to two of their nicknames; le Aquile ("the Eagles") and Aquilotti ("Eaglets"). The current club badge features a golden eagle above a white shield with a blue border; inside the shield is the club's name and a smaller tripartite shield with the colours of the club.

Stadium
Stadio Olimpico, located on the Foro Italico, is the major stadium of Rome. It is the home of the Italy national football team as well as of both local teams Lazio and Roma. It was opened in 1937 and after its latest renovation in 2008, the stadium has a capacity of 70,634 seats. It was the site of the 1960 Summer Olympics, but has also served as the location of the 1987 World Athletics Championships, the 1980 European Championship final, the 1990 World Cup and the Champions League Final in 1996 and 2009.

Also on the Foro Italico lies the Stadio dei Marmi, or "marble stadium", which was built in 1932 and designed by Enrico Del Debbio. It has tiers topped by 60 white marble statues that were gifts from Italian cities in commemoration of 60 athletes.

During the 1989–90 season, Lazio and Roma played their games at the Stadio Flaminio of Rome, located in the district Flaminio, because of the renovation works carried out at the Stadio Olimpico.

In June 2018, Lazio President Claudio Lotito stated that "Lazio should be granted the same favour and treatment as Roma – the ability to also build a new stadium. He also added that "Lazio's stadium will be built before Roma's stadium."

In June 2019, Lazio President Claudio Lotito was set to present the designs of a potential future stadium for Lazio, named the Stadio delle Aquile. However, this did not occur for reasons unknown.

Supporters and rivalries

Lazio is the sixth-most supported football club in Italy and the second in Rome, with around 2% of Italian football fans supporting the club (according to La Repubblica's research of August 2008). Historically, the largest section of Lazio supporters in the city of Rome has come from the far northern section, creating an arch-like shape across Rome with affluent areas such as Parioli, Prati, Flaminio, Cassia and Monte Mario.

Founded in 1987, Irriducibili Lazio were the club's biggest ultras group for over 30 years. They typically create traditional Italian ultra displays during the Derby della Capitale (Rome Derby), the match between Lazio and their main rivals, Roma. It is amongst the most heated and emotional footballing rivalries in the world, such as where Lazio fan Vincenzo Paparelli was killed at one of the derby games during the 1979–80 season after being hit in the eye by an emergency rocket thrown by a Roma fan. A minority of Lazio's ultras used to use swastikas and fascist symbols on their banners, and they have displayed racist behaviour in several occasions during the derbies. Most notably, at a derby of the season 1998–99, laziali unfurled a 50-metre banner around the Curva Nord that read, "Auschwitz is your town, the ovens are your houses". Black players of Roma have often been receivers of racist and offensive behaviour. After 33 years, the Irriducibili disbanded on 27 February 2020, citing "too much blood, too many banning orders, too many arrests." Lazio's ultras now go by the name Ultras Lazio. Lazio also have a strong rivalry with Napoli and Livorno, as well as with Pescara and Atalanta. The club also maintains strong competitive rivalries with Fiorentina, Juventus, and Milan.

Conversely, the ultras have friendly relationships with Internazionale, Triestina, and Hellas Verona. Internationally, Lazio's fans maintain a long-standing strong friendship with the supporters of the Bulgarian club Levski Sofia and as such, Lazio were invited to participate in the centenary football match honouring the birthday of the Bulgarian club.

Players

Current squad

Out on loan
.

Youth sector

Retired numbers

12 – Since the 2003–04 season, the Curva Nord of Stadio Olimpico, as a sign of recognition, is considered the 12th man on the pitch.

Notable managers

The following managers have all won at least one trophy when in charge of Lazio:

Honours

National
Serie A
Winners (2): 1973–74, 1999–2000

Coppa Italia
Winners (7): 1958, 1997–98, 1999–2000, 2003–04, 2008–09, 2012–13, 2018–19

Supercoppa Italiana
Winners (5): 1998, 2000, 2009, 2017, 2019

Serie B
Winners (1): 1968–69

European

UEFA Cup Winners' Cup
Winners (1): 1998–99

UEFA Super Cup
Winners (1): 1999

Statistics and records

Ștefan Radu holds Lazio's official appearance record, having played 416 appearances. The record for total appearances by a goalkeeper is held by Luca Marchegiani, with 339 appearances, while the record for most league appearances is held by Aldo Puccinelli with 339.

The all-time leading goalscorer for Lazio is Ciro Immobile, with 170 goals scored, followed by Silvio Piola with 159 goals. Piola, who played also with Pro Vercelli, Torino, Juventus and Novara, is also the highest goalscorer in Serie A history, with 274 goals. Simone Inzaghi is the all-time top goalscorer in European competitions, with 20 goals. He is also one of the five players who scored four goals in a single UEFA Champions League match.

Officially, Lazio's highest home attendance is approximately 80,000 for a Serie A match against Foggia on 12 May 1974, the match that awarded to Lazio their first Scudetto. This is also the record for the Stadio Olimpico, including matches held by Roma and the Italy national football team.

Società Sportiva Lazio as a company
In 1998, during Sergio Cragnotti's period in charge as the chairman, Società Sportiva Lazio S.p.A. became a listed company: Lazio were the first Italian club to do so. However, Cragnotti resigned as chairman in 2001, after a "huge hole in the budget" of the club.

Claudio Lotito, the current chairman of Lazio, purchased the club from Cragnotti in 2004, but owned just 26.969% of shares as the largest shareholders at that time. It was followed by banking group Capitalia (and its subsidiaries Mediocredito Centrale, Banca di Roma and Banco di Sicilia) as the second largest shareholders for 17.717%. Capitalia also hold 49% stake of Italpetroli (via Capitalia's subsidiary Banca di Roma), the parent company of city rival Roma (via Italpetroli's subsidiary "Roma 2000"). Lotito later purchased the minority stake from Capitalia.

, Claudio Lotito owns just over two-thirds of the shares of Lazio.  Lazio is one of only three Italian clubs listed on the Borsa Italiana, the others being Juventus and Roma. In the past, Lazio was the only one with a single primary share holder (Lotito). However, following several capital increases by Roma and Juventus, they also are significantly owned by a shareholder. According to The Football Money League, published by consultants Deloitte, in the 2004–05 season, Lazio was the 20th highest earning football club in the world with an estimated revenue of €83 million; the 2005 ranking of the club was 15th. However, in 2016 ranking (the rank used data in 2014–15 season), Lazio was not in the top 20.

Lazio was one of the few clubs that self-sustain from the financial support of a shareholder, and also consistently make an aggregate profit after every season. Unlike Inter Milan, Roma and Milan, who were sanctioned by UEFA due to breaches of Financial Fair Play, Lazio passed the regulations held by the administrative body with the high achievements.

In 2017, the club renewed their sponsorship deal with shirt manufacturer Macron. It was worth €16 million a season, plus variables of about €9 million stemming from league and European competition finishes.

In February 2022, Lazio announced that they had parted ways with Macron after 10 years. Mizuno would become the team’s new sportswear and technical gear provider, with the Biancocelesti receiving €20 million over the next five years as a result of their new agreement with the Japanese company.

In March 2022, Lazio released their financial reports from June to December 2021 which showed a decrease in revenue (from €106.66 to €71.56 million) but an increase in profit (from -€0.12 million to €4.6 million) compared to the previous six months.

Kit suppliers and shirt sponsors

See also

 Football in Italy
 Lazio (futsal)
 Lazio Women

References

Sources

External links

 
 S.S. Lazio  at Serie A 
 S.S. Lazio at UEFA
 S.S. Lazio at FIFA
 

 
Association football clubs established in 1900
Publicly traded sports companies
Companies listed on the Borsa Italiana
Italian football First Division clubs
Football clubs in Italy
Football clubs in Rome
Serie A clubs
Serie B clubs
Serie A winning clubs
Coppa Italia winning clubs
Multi-sport clubs in Italy
1900 establishments in Italy
UEFA Cup Winners' Cup winning clubs
UEFA Super Cup winning clubs